Out was a short film produced by the United Nations Film Board and directed by Lionel Rogosin on the refugee situation in Austria as a result of Hungarian Revolution of 1956. The film was conceived 28 November 1956, filming began on 3 December 1956, and the answer print was screened 4 January 1957.

External links 
 

1957 films
Films about the United Nations
Films directed by Lionel Rogosin
Hungarian Revolution of 1956
Documentary films about revolutions
Documentary films about refugees
1950s short documentary films
Documentary films about Hungary
1957 documentary films